Eigil Hansen (3 February 1922 – 21 January 1991) was a Danish field hockey player. He competed in the men's tournament at the 1948 Summer Olympics.

References

External links
 

1922 births
1991 deaths
Danish male field hockey players
Olympic field hockey players of Denmark
Field hockey players at the 1948 Summer Olympics
Sportspeople from Copenhagen